Sourdough Draw is a valley in the U.S. state of South Dakota.

Sourdough Draw was named for the sourdough bread which was a food staple of local prospectors.

References

Landforms of Custer County, South Dakota
Landforms of Pennington County, South Dakota
Valleys of South Dakota